Andrew Walters (born 1987) is an English male lawn and indoor bowler. He bowls for Broadway Bowling Club.

Career
He is an England international  and was the National singles champion in 2014 during the Men's National Championships.

In 2019, he won the pairs gold medal and team bronze medal at the European Bowls Championships. In 2022, he reached his third singles final at the National Championships where he lost out to Ed Morris 21-17 at the 2022 Bowls England National Finals.

Awards
He was awarded the 2009 Young Player of the Year by the World Bowls Tour.

Personal life
He married fellow bowls international Amy Stanton on 22 April 2017.

References

Living people
English male bowls players
1987 births
Bowls European Champions